Rui Filipe Vogado Ferreira dos Santos (born 2 April 1989 in Oeiras) is a Portuguese footballer who plays for Rápido de Bouzas as a goalkeeper.

On 16 September 2012, Santos made his professional debut with Casa Pia in a 2012–13 Taça de Portugal match against Penafiel.

References

External links
Stats and profile at LPFP 

1989 births
Living people
Portuguese footballers
Association football goalkeepers
Liga Portugal 2 players
Atlético Clube de Portugal players
Clube Oriental de Lisboa players
AD Oeiras players
Casa Pia A.C. players
SC Vianense players
C.D. Trofense players
Atlético S.C. players
F.C. Oliveira do Hospital players
Rápido de Bouzas players
Portuguese expatriate footballers
Expatriate footballers in Spain
Portuguese expatriate sportspeople in Spain
CD Arenteiro players